A rangatira is a chief among the Māori of New Zealand.

Rangatira may also refer to:

Rangatira (Cook Islands), a minor chief among the Cook Islanders
Rangatira Island, in the Chatham Archipelago, New Zealand
, a ferry that ran between New Zealand's North and South Islands

See also
Tino rangatiratanga, literally "chieftainship", in Māori affairs
Te Heke-rangatira-ki-Nukutaurua Boyd (1886–1959), a Māori tribal leader